This is a list of individuals currently serving in the National Assembly of Tanzania.

Members of Parlament

See also
 List of MPs elected in the 2015 Tanzania general election
 List of MPs elected in the 2010 Tanzania general election
 List of Tanzania National Assembly members 2005–2010

References

 
Parliament